Ratibad is a village in the Bhopal district of Madhya Pradesh, India. It is located in the Huzur tehsil and the Phanda block.

It is located close to the National Highway 12, near Parwaliya Sadak.

Demographics 

According to the 2011 census of India, Ratibad has 88 households. The effective literacy rate (i.e. the literacy rate of population excluding children aged 6 and below) is 79.63%.

References 

Villages in Huzur tehsil